The Sheriff of London Charity Shield, also known as the Dewar Shield, was a football competition played annually between the best amateur and best professional club in England, though Scottish amateur side Queens Park also took part in 1899. The professional side was either the Football League champion or FA Cup winner from the previous season while the amateurs were usually represented by Corinthians, a renowned amateur side of the time. The first game was played on 19 March 1898, after being devised by Sir Thomas Dewar and ratified by the Football Association, whose president Lord Kinnaird and former president Sir Francis Marindin sat on the Shield's committee.

Proceeds from the annual game were distributed to hospitals and charities. The game was the predecessor to the FA Charity Shield, today the FA Community Shield, which began in 1908 after the Amateur Football Association split from the Football Association. After 1908 the trophy was revived on seven occasions in the twentieth century to raise funds for grassroots football causes in matches played between London-based sides.

History

Formation

In 1898 a shield was offered by Sir Thomas Dewar, the Sheriff of London at the time, with the understanding that it would pit the best professional side and amateur side against each other with proceeds going to charity. A high profile committee of Football Association and amateur football representatives, politicians and England players past and present was formed composed of Sir Dewar; Lord Kinnaird (President of the FA); Sir Reginald Hanson (Lord Mayor of London); Sir Francis Marindin (Former President of the FA); Sir William Bromley-Davenport (Member of Parliament and former England international footballer); Colonel Harry McCalmont (Member of Parliament), R. Cunliffe Gosling (former England captain), Dr. Kemp (a former player for the London-based United Hospitals side), N. L. Jackson (FA Honorary Secretary and Founder of Corinthians), John Bentley (President of the Football League), and Charles Wreford-Brown (former England captain and FA Council member).

The competition lasted for nine years in its first incarnation, coming to an end in part due to the dominance of the professional sides, and also to a rift in the Football Association that saw the creation of the Amateur Football Association. Following the 1907 edition, won by Newcastle United, the shield was replaced in 1908 by the FA Charity Shield which rather than the best amateur side pitted the Football League winner against the winners of the Southern Football League and then later against the winner of the FA Cup.

Legacy
The match was later resurrected in the 1930s over four years at the suggestion of Charles Wreford-Brown, a member of the original Shield committee, to raise funds for the National Playing Fields Association. The trophy was again competed for in the 1960s for three years with funds supporting Corinthian Casuals Football Club, the successor to the original Corinthians side. The most recent match for the shield trophy was a one-off game played between Watford and Corinthian Casuals in 1983, marking the centenary of Corinthians original formation. Watford ran out as 6–1 winners. All seven matches in the post-1907 era were London-only affairs.

The shield itself, commissioned by Dewar, was over six feet high and believed to be the largest trophy to be competed for in the history of football. In the 1990s, the trophy was put up for auction by Corinthian Casuals to finance all-weather training facilities; it sold for around £25,000 to a private owner.

List of champions

Sheriff of London Charity Shield
 1898 Corinthians 0–0 Sheffield United (match replayed and drawn 1–1, shared)
 1899 Aston Villa 0–0 Queen's Park (shared)              
 1900 Corinthians 2–1 Aston Villa
 1901 Aston Villa 1–0 Corinthians
 1902 Tottenham Hotspur 5–2 Corinthians
 1903 Sunderland 3–0 Corinthians
 1904 Corinthians 10–3 Bury
 1905 The Wednesday 2–1 Corinthians
 1906 Liverpool 5–1 Corinthians
 1907 Newcastle United 5–2 Corinthians

Fundraising matches
 1931 Arsenal 5–3 Corinthians
 1932 Arsenal 9–2 Corinthians
 1934 Tottenham Hotspur 7–4 Corinthians
 1964 Arsenal 7–0 Corinthian Casuals
 1965 Arsenal 5–2 Corinthian Casuals
 1966 Watford 7–0 Corinthian Casuals
 1983 Watford 6–1 Corinthian Casuals

See also
FA Community Shield
Thomas Dewar
Corinthian F.C.

References

External links
 History of Sheriff of London (Dewar) Charity Shield

Defunct football competitions in England
1898 establishments in England
Recurring sporting events established in 1898
Charity football matches
Charity events in the United Kingdom
Annual sporting events in the United Kingdom